African free-tailed bats (Myopterus) are a genus of bat in the family Molossidae. It contains the following species:
 Daubenton's free-tailed bat (Myopterus daubentonii)
 Bini free-tailed bat (Myopterus whitleyi)

References 

 
Bat genera
Taxa named by Étienne Geoffroy Saint-Hilaire
Taxonomy articles created by Polbot